Pakur district is one of the twenty-four districts of Jharkhand state, India, and Pakur is the administrative headquarters of this district. Pakur sub-division of Sahibganj district was carved out on 28 January 1994 to constitute Pakur District. The district, with a population of 900,422 (census 2011), and covering an area of 686.21 km², is situated on the north-eastern corner of Jharkhand state.

Geography 
The district is bounded on the north by Sahibganj district, on the south by Dumka district, on the west by Godda district, and on the east by the Murshidabad district of West Bengal. The west of the district contains the Rajmahal Hills, while the east of the district is mostly flat plain.

Economy
It is famous for it's Black stone. It is generating the highest revenue for Howrah railway Division by supplying Black Stone Chips across India and Coal to Punjab.

In the past, Pakur was a land populated by Santhals and Mal Paharia people. However, over a period of time, demographic composition has gradually changed to the modern era, and the local folks have come to the mainstream of the Indian society.

In 2006 the Ministry of Panchayati Raj named Pakur one of the country's 250 most backward districts (out of a total of 640). It is one of the 21 districts in Jharkhand currently receiving funds from the Backward Regions Grant Fund Programme (BRGF).

Politics 

 |}

Administration

Blocks/Mandals 

Pakur district consists of six community development blocks. The following are the list of the blocks in the Pakur district:

Demographics

According to the 2011 census Pakur district has a population of 900,422, roughly equal to the nation of Fiji or the US state of Delaware. This gives it a ranking of 465th in India (out of a total of 640). Its population growth rate over the decade 2001-2011 was 28.15%. Pakur has a sex ratio of 985 females for every 1000 males, and a literacy rate of 50.17%. Scheduled Castes and Scheduled Tribes make up 3.16% and 42.10% of the population respectively.

At the time of the 2011 Census of India, 39.42% of the population in the district spoke Bengali, 36.40% Santali, 11.84% Khortha, 4.90% Malto, 2.83% Hindi, 1.77% Urdu and 1.66% Bhojpuri as their first language.

Villages
 

Ramnathpur

See also 
 Districts of Jharkhand

References

External links
Official district government website
Pakur District Population, Jharkhand - Census India 2011
Pakur district

 
Districts of Jharkhand
Minority Concentrated Districts in India